David Smith is a Republican member of the Florida Legislature representing the state's 38th House district.

Political career
Smith defeated Democrat Lee Mangold in the November 6, 2018 general election, winning 51.27% of the vote.

Military career 
David Smith graduated from Texas A&M University in 1982 with a bachelor's degree in Business Management and was commissioned as a Second Lieutenant in the U.S. Marine Corps through the Naval Reserve Officer Training Corps (NROTC) program. After attending The Basic School at MCB Quantico, Virginia, he proceeded to NAS Pensacola and later NAS Whiting Field, Florida, for flight training and was designated a Naval Aviator in 1984.

Reporting to MAG-39, MCAS Camp Pendleton, California, Smith completed UH-1N helicopter pilot training and was assigned to [Marine Helicopter Light Attack Squadron 367 (HMLA-367) until 1990. During this period, he served in numerous squadron Operations, Logistics and Maintenance billets and completed two deployments to Okinawa, Japan and one WESTPAC deployment aboard the USS Tarawa (LHA-1) while attached to Marine Medium Helicopter Squadron 163 (HMM-163), 11th MEU (SOC) as a Weapons and Tactics Instructor (WTI).

In 1990, Smith was reassigned to Marine Helicopter Training Squadron 303 (HMT-303), the Marine Corps’ H-1 helicopter Fleet Replacement Squadron (FRS), as a UH-1N Instructor Pilot, where he also served as the squadron's Assistant Operations Officer and Director of Safety and Standardization. As the designated NATOPS Evaluator for the H-1 FRS, he also had the additional responsibility of being the UH/HH-1N Model Manager. He supervised significant updates to the NATOPS manual due to aircraft configuration changes and also to pilot and crew chief emergency procedure checklists.

During his career he flew more than 4,500 accident free flight hours and was a designated Weapons and Tactics Instructor (WTI). He made six extended deployments overseas or aboard ship, including a combat tour flying in Operation Iraqi Freedom.

He had Command assignments or Program Management responsibility for three separate billion-dollar programs, with his final Marine Corps assignment as Program Manager, Training Systems (PM TRASYS), leading a military and civilian workforce adjacent to Naval Support Activity Orlando at the Central Florida Research Park in Orlando, Florida that managed $1.4 billion worth of Marine Corps modeling, simulation & training (MS&T) projects.

After 30 years of service, David retired from the Marine Corps at the rank of Colonel.

Personal 
Smith has worked in the private sector of Central Florida's Simulation & Training industry for the last seven years. He currently owns a business consulting company.

David presently lives in Winter Springs and is very active in community affairs. He is a Paul Harris fellow at the Winter Springs Rotary Club, a member of the Seminole County Regional Chamber of Commerce, VFW Post 5405 and multiple other Veterans organizations and local non-profit groups. He is a member of Leadership Orlando class #78 and Leadership Seminole class #26. David is a member of CrossLife Church in Oviedo.

References

Smith, David
Living people
21st-century American politicians
Texas A&M University alumni
Florida Institute of Technology alumni
1960 births